Siladitya Sen is an Indian film -critic, -analyst, -journalist, -jury member, based in Kolkata. He writes for the Bengali newspaper, Anandabazar Patrika.

Jury member
National Film Award for Best Writing on Cinema 
FCCI Award for Best Debut Film at HBFF 
Mumbai International Film Festival

Books
Co-author, Indian Film Culture: Indian Cinema
Author, Mrinal Sener Film Jatra

References

External links
Film Critics Circle of India
Professor Chinmoy Guha and Shiladitya Sen on Satyajit Ray’s Pratidwandi (The Adversary)

Year of birth missing (living people)
Living people
Indian film critics